"You Can't Hurry Love" is a 1966 song originally recorded by the Supremes on the Motown label. It was released on July 25 of 1966 as the second single from their studio album The Supremes A' Go-Go (1966).

Written and produced by Motown production team Holland–Dozier–Holland, the song topped the United States Billboard pop singles chart, made the UK top five, and made the top 10 in the Australian Singles Chart. It was released and peaked in late summer and early autumn in 1966. Sixteen years later, it would become a number-one hit in the UK when Phil Collins re-recorded the song. It reached number one on the UK Singles Chart for two weeks beginning in January 1983 and reached number one on the US Billboard Hot 100 that same month.

Billboard named the song number 19 on their list of 100 Greatest Girl Group Songs of All Time. The BBC ranked "You Can't Hurry Love" at number 16 on The Top 100 Digital Motown Chart, which is based solely on all time UK downloads and streams of Motown releases.

History

Overview 
The song, a memory of a mother's words of encouragement ("My mama said 'you can't hurry love/No you just have to wait' ") telling her daughter that with patience she will find that special someone one day, is an example of the strong influence of gospel music present in much of R&B and soul music. "You Can't Hurry Love" was inspired by and partially based upon "(You Can't Hurry God) He's Right on Time" ("You can't hurry God/you just have to wait/Trust and give him time/no matter how long it takes"), a 1950s gospel song written by Dorothy Love Coates of the Original Gospel Harmonettes.

The recorded version of "You Can't Hurry Love" showcases the developing sound of the Supremes, who were progressing from their earlier teen-pop into more mature themes and musical arrangements. This song and "You Keep Me Hangin' On" were finished together; when it came time to choose which single would be issued first, Motown's Quality Control department chose "You Can't Hurry Love."

Written and produced by Motown's main production team, Holland–Dozier–Holland, "You Can't Hurry Love" is one of the signature Supremes songs, and also one of Motown's signature releases.  Billboard described the single as "the group's most exciting side to date" with "top vocal" and "exceptional instrumental backing." Cash Box said that it is a "pulsating pop-r&b rhythmic ode which contends that romance is a slow-developing game of give-and-take."

The single became the Supremes' seventh number-one hit, topping the Billboard Hot 100 singles chart for two weeks, from September 4, 1966 to September 17, 1966, and reaching number one on the soul chart for two weeks. The group performed the song on the CBS variety program The Ed Sullivan Show on Sunday, September 25, 1966.

"You Can't Hurry Love" was the second single from the Supremes' album The Supremes A' Go-Go. It reached the number one position on the Billboard Hot 100 pop chart in the United States, and number three in the United Kingdom. The Supremes' version of the song is honored by inclusion in the Rock and Roll Hall of Fame's permanent collection of 500 Songs that Shaped Rock and Roll.

The Supremes also released a version sung in Italian: "L'amore verrà" ("Love Will Come").

Personnel
Lead vocals by Diana Ross
Background vocals by Mary Wilson and Marlene Barrow
Instrumentation by the Funk Brothers
Earl Van Dyke – piano 
Robert White – guitar 
James Jamerson – bass guitar
Benny Benjamin – drums 
Jack Ashford – tambourine

Chart performance

Weekly charts

Year-end charts

Certifications

Phil Collins version 

The most notable cover of the song was released in November 1982 as a single by Phil Collins from his second solo album, Hello, I Must Be Going! Collins's version reached number-one on the UK Singles Chart for two weeks in January 1983 (becoming his first number-one solo hit in the UK Singles Chart, and peaking two positions higher than the original song did in that country), and reached number 10 in the United States (his first top 10 single in the U.S.). The single was certified gold in the UK. The orchestral strings on this track were recorded in Studio 1  at CBS Recording Studios, London W1 by Recording Engineer Mike Ross-Trevor (assisted by Richard Hollywood) on the evening of Thursday, June 24, 1982. Collins' cover was both virtuoso, and at the same time, the most popular Collins performance effort to date, and thus considerably his breakthrough work as a solo artist.

Collins said that "The idea of doing 'Can't Hurry Love' was to see if Hugh Padgham and I could duplicate that Sixties sound. It's very difficult today because most recording facilities are so much more sophisticated than they were back then. It's therefore hard to make the drums sound as rough as they did on the original. That's what we were going after, a remake, not an interpretation, but a remake.

In 1983, the music video was released on the home video Phil Collins available on Video Home System (VHS) and LaserDisc (LD) which received a Grammy nomination for Best Video, Short Form. The video itself was also the first track featured on the first VHS compilation of Now: That's What I Call Music.

Personnel 
Phil Collins – vocals, drums and tambourine
Daryl Stuermer – guitars
John Giblin – bass guitar
J. Peter Robinson –  piano, glockenspiel and vibraphone
Strings arranged and conducted by Martyn Ford
 The Mountain Fjord Orchestra – strings

Chart performance

Weekly charts

Year-end charts

Certifications

Other versions and interpolations 
This song was covered by Melanie Safka in 1975 and release on her album “Sunsets and Other Beginnings”.
 Iggy Pop's 1977 song Lust for Life would feature a drumbeat, performed by Hunt Sales, that is heavily inspired by this song. Under the influence of Lust for Life, Jet would use the beat for  2003's Are You Gonna Be My Girl and Travis would also use it for 2007's Selfish Jean.
 Phil Seymour's 1979 studio version was a KROQ favorite. An alternative version appeared on the 2017 Ace Records album “Phil Seymour ~ Prince Of Power Pop".
 The song was included as the flip side of the single Rock This Town by the American rockabilly band Stray Cats. The record reached the top 10 in the UK and various European countries such as Ireland, France, Belgium, Germany, Finland, the Netherlands, as well as in Australia and Japan, which contributed to the popularity of the song.
 The song was covered by the Dixie Chicks on the soundtrack to the 1999 film Runaway Bride. Their version peaked at number 60 on the Billboard Hot Country Singles & Tracks chart.
 In 2009 Nina Zilli released a version that has both Italian and English lyrics as a single, later part of her self-titled EP 
 In 2019, the song was covered by Rafael de La Fuente and Elizabeth Gillies in a musical episode of the television series Dynasty.
 A "punk-ish" version by D.L. Byron appears on the soundtrack to the 1980 movie Times Square

See also 
List of Hot 100 number-one singles of 1966 (U.S.)

References

External links 
 
 

1966 songs
1966 singles
1982 singles
The Supremes songs
Billboard Hot 100 number-one singles
Cashbox number-one singles
RPM Top Singles number-one singles
UK Singles Chart number-one singles
Dutch Top 40 number-one singles
Number-one singles in Germany
Phil Collins songs
The Chicks songs
Songs written by Holland–Dozier–Holland
Motown singles
Virgin Records singles
Atlantic Records singles
Song recordings produced by Brian Holland
Song recordings produced by Lamont Dozier